The 1975 Campeón de Campeones was the 30th edition of the Campeón de Campeones. The match-up featured Toluca, the winners of the 1974–75 Mexican Primera División, and UNAM, the winners of the 1974–75 Copa México. It was played at Estadio Olímpico Universitario, Mexico City, on 27 August 1975.

UNAM won the match 1–0 to secure their first Campeón de Campeones title.

Teams

Match

Summary

Details
The Mexican Primera División winners were designated as the "home" team for administrative purposes.

References

Campeón de Campeones
Football in Mexico
1974–75 in Mexican football
August 1975 sports events in Mexico